Gombether See is a lake in Westhessische Senke, Hesse, Germany. At an elevation of 177 m, its surface area is 30 ha.

Lakes of Hesse
Borken, Hesse